Ressad or Ress refers to a now lost city and possibly also to a territory that is still unidentified but believed by scholars to have been somewhere within the borders of modern County Limerick in western Ireland, in what was once the territory of the kingdom of the Uí Fidgenti.

The name occurs in only a small number of surviving sources, which for this region of Ireland, of once respectable wealth, are generally quite poor.

Battle of Ressad
 Túathal Techtmar

Colmán of Cloyne
According to the early tale known as Conall Corc and the Corcu Luigde, Saint Colmán of Cloyne cursed the city of Ressad, which brought down its walls.

Kings of Ressad
Only two Kings of Ressad are known from the surviving sources, both probably belonging to the second half of the 10th century.

The Annals of Inisfallen style Donnubán mac Cathail, until this time styled King of Uí Fidgenti, instead King of Ressad at his death in 980. He is the only king ever so styled in all the (surviving and intact) Irish annals.

The early 12th century saga and political tract Cogad Gáedel re Gallaib names the only other known King of Ressad as the otherwise unknown Flaithrí mac Allamarain, but who is said to belong to the 10th century like Donnubán and may have preceded him. The author of CGG states he was one of the Munster kings slain by Ivar of Limerick circa 967 before the Battle of Sulcoit. Notably Donnubán was Ivar's ally, and is said to have been his son-in-law, but none of this is specifically associated with Ressad in the passage.

Finally, whether related to Ress/Ressad or not, there is also a Flann Ressach in one of the Uí Cairbre (ancestral to O'Donovan and other families) pedigrees preserved in the Book of Glendalough (this particular entry having been copied from the lost Psalter of Cashel).

Reerasta Rath
It is possible that the Ráth called Reerasta, where was found the internationally famous Ardagh Chalice (Hoard) in western County Limerick, is a corruption of Rí Ressad.

See also
 Ardagh Fort

Notes

References

 
 Edel Bhreathnach, "The cultural and political milieu of the deposition and manufacture of the hoard discovered at Reerasta Rath, Ardagh, Co. Limerick", in Mark Redknap (ed.), Pattern and Purpose in Insular Art. Oxbow Books. 2001.
 Vernam Hull (tr.), "Conall Corc and the Corco Luigde", in Proceedings of the Modern Language Association 62 (1947): 887–909
 Paul MacCotter, Colmán of Cloyne: A Study. Dublin: Four Courts Press. 1994.
 Paul MacCotter, Medieval Ireland: Territorial, Political and Economic Divisions. Dublin: Four Courts Press. 2008.
 Kuno Meyer (ed.), "Conall Corc and the Corcu Luigde (Laud 610)", in Anecdota from Irish Manuscripts III. Dublin: Hodges & Figgis. 1910. pp. 57–63
 William O'Brien, Nick Hogan & James O'Driscoll, "Archaeological Investigations at Ballylin Hillfort, Co. Limerick", in North Munster Antiquarian Journal, Vol. 56, 2016.
 James Henthorn Todd (ed. & tr.), Cogadh Gaedhel re Gallaibh: The War of the Gaedhil with the Gaill. London: Longmans. 1867.

History of County Limerick
Lost cities and towns
O'Donovan family